Petrese B. Tucker (born May 17, 1951) is a Senior United States district judge of the United States District Court for the Eastern District of Pennsylvania.

Education and career

Born in Philadelphia, Pennsylvania, Tucker received a Bachelor of Arts degree from Temple University in 1973 and a Juris Doctor from Temple University School of Law in 1976. She was a law clerk for Judge Lawrence Prattis of the Common Pleas Court from 1976 to 1978. She was in private practice in Pennsylvania from 1977 to 1978. She was an Assistant District Attorney of Philadelphia, District Attorney Office from 1978 to 1986. She was an Adjunct Professor, Great Lakes Colleges Association from 1984 to 1985. She was a senior trial attorney of Southeastern Transportation Authority Legal Department from 1986 to 1987. She was a judge on the Court of Common Pleas, Commonwealth of Pennsylvania from 1987 to 2000.

Federal judicial service

On July 27, 1999, Tucker was nominated by President Bill Clinton to a seat on the United States District Court for the Eastern District of Pennsylvania vacated by Thomas N. O'Neill, Jr. She was confirmed by the United States Senate on May 24, 2000, and received her commission on June 1, 2000. Tucker served as Chief Judge of the District from May 1, 2013 to July 31, 2017. She assumed senior status on June 1, 2021.

See also 
 List of African-American federal judges
 List of African-American jurists
 List of first women lawyers and judges in Pennsylvania

References

Sources

1951 births
Living people
20th-century American judges
20th-century American women judges
21st-century American women judges
21st-century American judges
African-American judges
Judges of the Pennsylvania Courts of Common Pleas
Judges of the United States District Court for the Eastern District of Pennsylvania
Lawyers from Philadelphia
Temple University Beasley School of Law alumni
United States district court judges appointed by Bill Clinton